Heavy Trash is the debut album by Heavy Trash, released on Yep Roc in 2005.

Track listing

References

2005 debut albums
Heavy Trash albums
Yep Roc Records albums